Yangmei station, is a station of Shenzhen Metro Line 5. It opened on 22 June 2011.

Station layout

Exits

References

External links
 Shenzhen Metro Yangmei Station (Chinese)
 Shenzhen Metro Yangmei Station (English)

Railway stations in Guangdong
Shenzhen Metro stations
Longgang District, Shenzhen
Railway stations in China opened in 2011